Marta Inés Varela (born April 20, 1943) is an Argentine composer, pianist, and teacher.

Born in Rosario, Santa Fe, Varela studied piano under , chamber music under , and composition and orchestration under  and Francisco Kröpfl. She is a graduate of the music school at the National University of Rosario, from which she received a degree to teach harmony and composition; she has since served as director and professor at the same school. With Emma Garmendia, she was the developer of the  pedagogical method. As a composer she has written works for a variety of instruments, including chamber pieces and larger-scale works for orchestra.

References

1943 births
Living people
Argentine classical composers
Women classical composers
20th-century Argentine musicians
20th-century classical composers
21st-century Argentine musicians
21st-century classical composers
Musicians from Rosario, Santa Fe
National University of Rosario alumni
Academic staff of the National University of Rosario
20th-century women composers
21st-century women composers
Argentine women composers